Camden Park is a suburb of the city of Adelaide, South Australia.

Camden Park is in the City of West Torrens local government area. It is split between the South Australian House of Assembly electoral districts of Ashford and West Torrens. At the federal level, Camden Park is in the Division of Hindmarsh. 

Camden Park Post Office closed in 1990.

References

Suburbs of Adelaide